The Pan-African Congress was a series of eight meetings, held in 1919 in Paris (1st Pan-African Congress), 1921 in London, Brussels and Paris (2nd Pan-African Congress), 1923 in London (3rd Pan-African Congress), 1927 in New York City (4th Pan-African Congress), 1945 in Manchester (5th Pan-African Congress), 1974 in Dar es Salaam (6th Pan-African Congress), 1994 in Kampala (7th Pan-African Congress), and 2014 in Johannesburg (8th Pan-African Congress) that were intended to address the issues facing Africa as a result of European colonization of most of the continent.

The Pan-African Congress gained the reputation as a peace maker for decolonization in Africa and in the West Indies. It made significant advance for the Pan-African cause. One of the group's major demands was to end colonial rule and racial discrimination. It stood against imperialism and it demanded human rights and equality of economic opportunity. The manifesto given by the Pan-African Congress included the political and economic demands of the Congress for a new world context of international cooperation.

Background 
Colonial powers in Africa wanted native Africans to wait patiently for limited political concessions and better career opportunities. Due to their exclusion from the negotiations of the 1919 Treaty of Versailles – the most important of the peace treaties that brought World War I to an end – black ex-servicemen and educated urban classes became disillusioned. Because colonialism had been built on the foundation of capitalism, socialist ideas of equality and global collaboration appealed to these budding revolutionaries.

A letter from Jamaican writer and socialist Claude McKay to Leon Trotsky in 1922 refers to the experience of black soldiers:

1st Pan-African Congress: Saint-Étienne (1919) 

In February 1919, the first Pan-African Congress was organized by W. E. B. Du Bois and Ida Gibbs Hunt, wife of US Consul William Henry Hunt, who was at that time working at the American consulate in Saint-Étienne, France. Gibbs and Du Bois were seen as ambassadors of Pan-Africa. Also, Gibbs acted as the primary translator at the Congress. There were 57 delegates representing 15 countries, a smaller number than originally intended because British and American governments refused to issue passports to their citizens who had planned on attending. Their main task was petitioning the Versailles Peace Conference held in Paris at that time. Among their demands were that:
 The Allied Powers should be in charge of the administration of former territories in Africa as a Condominium on behalf of the Africans who were living there.
 Africa be granted home rule and Africans should take part in governing their countries as fast as their development permits until at some specified time in the future.

Delegates
Among the delegates were:
 Eliezer Cadet, Universal Negro Improvement Association
 Gratien Candace, Guadeloupe
 Blaise Diagne, Senegal, and French Commissioner General of the Ministry of Colonies
 William Jernagin, Washington, United States
 Charles D. B. King, Liberia
 Richard R. Wright
 Robert Russa Moton

2nd Pan-African Congress: London, Brussels and Paris (1921) 

In 1921, the Second Pan-African Congress met in several sessions in London, Brussels and Paris, during August (28, 29, and 31) and September (2, 3, 5 and 6). As W. E. B. Du Bois reported in The Crisis in November that year, represented at this congress were "26 different groups of people of Negro descent: namely, British Nigeria, Gold Coast and Sierra Leone; the Egyptian Sudan, British East Africa, former German East Africa; French Senegal, the French Congo and Madagascar; Belgian Congo; Portuguese St. Thomé, Angola and Mozambique; Liberia; Abyssinia; Haiti; British Jamaica and Grenada; French Martinique and Guadeloupe; British Guiana; the United States of America, Negroes resident in England, France, Belgium and Portugal, and fraternal visitors from India, Morocco, the Philippines and Annam." There was an Indian revolutionary who took part, Shapurji Saklatvala, and a journalist from the Gold Coast named W. F. Hutchinson who spoke. This session of the Congress was the most focused for change of all the meetings thus far. At the London session, resolutions were adopted, later restated by Du Bois in his "Manifesto To the League of Nations":

The only dissenting voices were these of Blaise Diagne and Gratien Candace, French politicians of African and Guadeloupean descent, who represented Senegal and Guadeloupe in the French Chamber of Deputies. They soon abandoned the idea of Pan-Africanism because they advocated equal rights inside the French citizenship and thought the London Manifesto declaration too dangerously extreme.

The Brussels sessions were hosted at the Palais Mondial.

3rd Pan-African Congress: London and Lisbon (1923) 
In 1923, the Third Pan-African Congress was held in London and in Lisbon. This meeting was totally unorganized. This meeting also repeated the demands such as self-rule, the problems in the Diaspora and the African-European relationship. The following was addressed at the meeting:

 The development of Africa should be for the benefit of Africans and not merely for the profits of Europeans.
 There should be home rule and a responsible government for British West Africa and the British West Indies.
 The Abolition of the pretension of a white minority to dominate a black majority in Kenya, Rhodesia and South Africa.
 Lynching and mob law in the US should be suppressed.

Before the Congress met in London, Isaac Béton of the French Committee wrote a letter to Du Bois, telling him that the French group would not be sending delegates. However, in one of the reports he published in The Crisis, Du Bois drew on words spoken by Ida Gibbs Hunt and Rayford Logan to imply that the French Committee had sent delegates. As long-time African-American residents of France, Hunt and Logan had travelled independently to the meeting, and Hunt and Béton were perturbed that Du Bois had implied they represented France.

4th Pan-African Congress: New York City (1927) 
In 1927, The Fourth Pan-African Congress was held in New York City and adopted resolutions that were similar to the Third Pan-African Congress meetings.

5th Pan-African Congress: Manchester (1945) 

Following the foundation of the Pan-African Federation (PAF) in Manchester in 1945, the Fifth Pan-African Congress was held at the Chorlton-on-Medlock Town Hall, Manchester, United Kingdom, between the 15th and 21st of October 1945. Amongst attendees were Hastings Banda, Kwame Nkrumah and Jomo Kenyatta who would go on to be the first Presidents of their newly independent countries. Commentators estimate that 87–90 delegates were in attendance at the Congress, representing some 50 organisations, with a total of 200 audience members present.

It was the wish of the West African Students' Union that the event be hosted in Liberia and not in Europe, however having originally been scheduled in Paris to coincide with a meeting of the World Federation of Trade Unions, it was switched to August in Manchester. The Conference took place in a building decorated with the flags of the three black nations under self-governance at the time Ethiopia, and Liberia and the Republic of Haiti.

The Fifth Congress is widely viewed by commentators as the most significant, being held just months after the end of World War II which had been fought in the name of freedom. At the end of World War II, around 700 million people lived under imperial rule and were 'subject people', with no freedoms, no parliaments, no democracy, and no trade unions to protect workers. The 1945 Congress, although within the larger Pan-African movement that had started at the beginning of the century, was organised by people in Manchester, and they brought in the people from all over the world." Whilst the previous four congresses had involved predominantly Africans, the fifth included the diaspora including those in the United Kingdom, Afro-Caribbeans and Afro-Americans." 

Historian Christian Høgsbjerg writes in his essay "Remembering the Fifth Pan African Congress" that the aftermath of World War II gave rise to a "new mood of militancy among colonial Africans, Asians and West Indians." According to Høgsbjerg, many felt betrayed after being promised movement towards self-government if they fought for European colonial powers during the First World War – only to have such promises later denied. Høgsbjerg writes that "many were determined not to be fooled again.'' The Congress made demands for decolonization as well as condemning imperialism, racial discrimination, and capitalism.

Attendees 
Marika Sherwood notes that "There were also eleven listed 'fraternal delegates', from Cypriot, Somali, Indian and Ceylonese (Sri Lankan) organisations, as well as the Women's International League and two British political parties, the Common Wealth Party and Independent Labour Party". Historian Saheed Adejumobi writes in The Pan-African Congresses, 1900–1945  that “while previous Pan-African congresses had been controlled largely by black middle-class British and American intellectuals who had emphasized the amelioration of colonial conditions, the Manchester meeting was dominated by delegates from Africa and Africans working or studying in Britain.”  Adejumobi notes that “the new leadership attracted the support of workers, trade unionists, and a growing radical sector of the African student population. With fewer African American participants, delegates consisted mainly of an emerging crop of African intellectual and political leaders, who soon won fame, notoriety, and power in their various colonized countries.”

Commentators regard the following as the primary organisers of the Fifth Pan-African Congress :
 Peter Abrahams - A South African born novelist, journalist and political commentator.
 T. Ras Makonnen - A Guyanese-born activist of Ethiopian descent. Secretary of the Pan-African Federation and advisor to the First President of Kenya, Jomo Kenyatta.
 Dr Peter Milliard - A British Guianan doctor and President of the Pan-African Federation.
 Kwame Nkrumah - Became the First Prime Minister and President of Ghana having led the country to Independence from Britain in 1957. Renowned for organising diasporic Pan-Africanists and developing his own political philosophy.
 George Padmore - Originally from Trinidad & Tobago, he was a founder of the Pan-African Federation and later an advisor to Kwame Nkrumah.
Those in attendance include:
 Modupe Alakija - A Nigerian barrister and married to Bankole Awoonor-Renner
 Surat Alley - A trade unionist and political activist campaigning for the rights of Indian seamen – in Britain in the 1930s and 1940s. 
 Joe Appiah - A Ghanian lawyer, politician and statesman.
 Raphael Armattoe - Was nominated for the 1949 Nobel Prize in Physiology or Medicine.
 Obafemi Awolowo - A Nigerian politician who would play a key role in Nigeria’s Independence movement.
 Hastings Banda - Became the First Prime Minister and later President of Malawi after campaigning for its independence up to 1964.
 Kojo Botsio - Became Ghana's second Minister of External Affairs and fifth Minister for Foreign Affairs within Nkrumah's government.
 Wilf Charles - Established the New International Society in Moss Side, Manchester, in 1946.
 A. S. Coker - A Nigerian Trade Unionist.
 H. O. Davies - A Federal Minister of State in the Ministry of Industries from 1963–1966 during the Nigerian First Republic.
 Pat Devine - A radical socialist economist (industrial economics and comparative economic systems).
 W. E. B. Du Bois - An eminent figure within the early Pan-Africanism, founder of NAACP and winner of the 1959 Lenin Peace Prize.
 E. J. Du Plau - Welfare worker in charge of black seamen in Liverpool.
 Nagendranath Gangulee - An Indian academic.
 Amy Ashwood Garvey - Director of the Black Star Line Steamship Corporation and co-founded the Negro World newspaper.
 Alderman Jackson - The Lord Mayor of Manchester.
 Len Johnson - A Black British boxer and activist.
 Jomo Kenyatta - Became the First Prime Minister of Kenya following campaigning for its independence.
 Alma La Badie - A Jamaican activist.
 Kurankyi-Taylor - Prominent Ghanaian judge and activist living in Liverpool.
 John McNair - Secretary of the Independent Labour Party.
 Aaron Albert Mossell - The first African-American graduate from University of Pennsylvania Law School, who later founded the Cardiff International Coloured Association. He was also uncle of Paul Robeson.

Tikiri Banda Subasinghe - Became the Sri Lankan Parliament Speaker and the Ambassador to the Soviet Union. He also served as Parliamentary Secretary to the Minister of Defence and External Affairs and Minister of Industries and Scientific Affairs.
 Dudley Thompson - Became Jamaican Minister of Foreign Affairs and Foreign Trade, Minister of Mining and Natural Resources and Minister of National Security and Justice.
 Jaja Wachuku - Became the first Speaker of the Nigerian House of Representatives, Nigeria's United Nations Ambassador and Minister of Foreign Affairs.

 I. T. A. Wallace-Johnson - was a Sierra Leonean, British West African workers' leader, journalist, activist and politician.
The future first President of Nigeria, Nnamdi Azikiwe, known as the "father of Nigerian Nationalism" is also claimed to have attended by some sources however it is unconfirmed; however he is on the record saying how important the conference in Manchester was for the independence movement.

Issues addressed 
Among the issues addressed at the conference were:

 "The Colour Problem in Britain", Including issues of unemployment among black youth; abandoned mixed-race children fathered by black ex-servicemen and white British mothers; racial discrimination, the colour bar and discriminatory employment practices. These topics were discussed at the first session of the Congress held on October 15, 1945, chaired by Amy Ashwood Garvey.
 "Imperialism in North and West Africa". All present demanded independence for African nations; delegates were split on the issue of having political emancipation first or control of the economy. Kwame Nkrumah advocated for revolutionary methods of seizing power as essential to Independence. From this session onwards the chair was taken by Dr W. E. B. Du Bois.
 "Oppression in South Africa". Including the social, economic, educational, health and employment inequalities faced by Black South Africans. All present expressed support and sympathy which included a number of demands outlined.
 "The East African Picture". Focusing on the issue of land, most of the best land had been occupied by White settlers; working conditions and wages for Africans reflected the same inequalities as South Africa. This session was open by Jomo Kenyatta.
 "Ethiopia and The Black Republics". Discussing the issue of Britain exercising control over Ethiopia although Emperor Haile Selassie had been restored to the throne; the United Nations not offering help to Ethiopia whilst Italy (which conquered Ethiopia in 1935 under a fascist regime) was receiving UN help.
 "The Problems in the Caribbean" This session was addressed by a number of trade union delegates from the Caribbean; some delegates demanded "complete independence", some "self-government" and others "dominion status".

Women's contributions 
Women played an important role in the Fifth Congress. Amy Ashford Garvey chaired the opening session and Miss Alma La Badie, a Jamaican member of the Universal Negro Improvement Association, spoke about child welfare. Women also supported in behind-the-scenes roles, organising many of the social and other events outside the main sessions. Historians Marika Sherwood and Hakim Adi have specifically written about women involved in the Fifth-Congress.

Reception 
The British press scarcely mentioned the conference. However, Picture Post covered the 5th Pan African Congress in an article by war reporter Hilde Marchant titled "Africa Speaks in Manchester", published on 10 November 1945. Picture Post was also responsible for sending John Deakin to photograph the event.

Commemoration 

 Red Commemorative Plaque. It is suggested by commentators that Manchester community leader and political activist, Kath Locke, persuaded Manchester City Council to place a red plaque commemorating the Congress on the wall of Chorlton Town Hall.
 Black Chronicles III: The Fifth Pan African Congress. Autograph ABP hosted the first exhibition showcasing John Deakin's photographs from the Fifth Congress. The exhibition marked the 70th anniversary of the Congress in 2015 and included film screenings exploring Pan-African history and ideals curated by June Givanni.
 "Pan African Congress 50 years on". The project interviewed attendees of the 1945 Pan African Congress who were still living in Manchester in 1995. The project was part of the 50th commemorative event held in Manchester in 1995. 
 "PAC@75". Manchester Metropolitan University held a four-day celebration in October 2020 to mark the 75th anniversary of the 5th Pan-African Congress. Curated by Professor of Architecture Ola Uduku, the anniversary celebrations involved both creative and academic events.
 Archive material relating to the 1945 and the subsequent celebratory events in 1982 and 1995 are held at the Ahmed Iqbal Ullah Race Relations Resource Centre at Manchester Central Library. Len Johnson's papers at the Working Class Movement Library has records and documents from the 1945 Congress.

6th Pan-African Congress: Dar es Salaam (1974) 
The 6th Pan-African Congress was hosted in Dar es Salaam, Tanzania in June 1974. For Black British activists Zainab Abbas, Gerlin Bean, Ron Phillips, and Ansel Wong, attending the conference allowed them to express the solidarity of the Black activists in Britain with anti-colonialists activists in the rest of the world. A highlight of the conference was the resolution on Palestine, which was the congress' formal recognition of the right of the Palestinian people to self-determination.

See also
 First Pan-African Conference
 Pan-Africanism

References

External links

 SNCC Digital Gateway: Organizing 6PAC. Digital documentary website created by the SNCC Legacy Project and Duke University, telling the story of the Student Nonviolent Coordinating Committee and grassroots organizing from the inside-out
 Christian Høgsbjerg, "Remembering the Fifth Pan-African Congress", Leeds African Studies Bulletin, 77 (2015–16). 
 B. F. Bankie, "The 'Key Link' – some London notes towards the 7th Pan-African Congress", Ghana Nsem, 2001.

International conferences
Anti-racist organizations in Africa
Pan-African organizations